Guns is a solo studio album by American rapper and record producer Quelle Chris. It was released on March 29, 2019 through Mello Music Group with distribution via The Orchard. Production was handled by Chris Keys, Dane, and Quelle himself. It features guest appearances from Bilal Salaam, Cavalier, Denmark Vessey, Eldar Djangirov, James Acaster, Jean Grae, Jonathan Hoard, Mach-Hommy, and Ugly Boy Modeling.

Critical reception

At Metacritic, which assigns a weighted average score out of 100 to reviews from mainstream critics, the album received an average score of 81, based on 4 reviews, indicating "universal acclaim".

Paul Simpson of AllMusic gave the album 4 stars out of 5, calling it Quelle Chris' "best, most enjoyable work." Kyle Mullin of Exclaim! gave the album a 7 out of 10, writing, "While this is an album with no shortage of ambition, and one that will certainly make demands on its listeners, their patience will certainly be rewarded by the multitudes that Quelle brings forth on Guns."

Track listing

Personnel
Credits adapted from liner notes.

 Gavin Christopher Tennille – main artist, producer (3–13), artwork, layout
 Bilal Salaam – featured artist (9, 10), additional vocals (1)
 Tsidi Ibrahim – featured artist (12), additional vocals (2)
 Ugly Boy Modeling – featured artist (5)
 Mach-Hommy – featured artist (6)
 Denmark Vessey – featured artist (7)
 Maurese – additional vocals (7)
 Ronnie "Hands" Palmolive – additional vocals (7)
 Shaka King – additional vocals (7)
 Cavalier – featured artist (10), layout
 Eldar Djangirov – featured artist, piano (10)
 James Acaster – featured artist, additional vocals (10)
 Jonathan Hoard – featured artist (12)
 Dane – additional guitar (7), bass guitar and mixing (12), producer (1)
 Chris Keys – keyboards (10), additional keyboards (11), producer (2), co-producer (10, 11)
 Paul "Bae Bro" Wilson – keyboards and organ (12), mixing, mastering
 Daoud – piano (12)

References

External links
 
 Guns at Bandcamp

2019 albums
Hip hop albums by American artists
Mello Music Group albums
Albums produced by Quelle Chris